The 2016 Texas Tech Red Raiders baseball team represents Texas Tech University during the 2016 NCAA Division I baseball season. The Red Raiders play their home games at Dan Law Field at Rip Griffin Park as a member of the Big 12 Conference. They are led by head coach Tim Tadlock, in his 4th season at Texas Tech.

Previous season
The 2015 Texas Tech Red Raiders baseball team notched a 31–24 (13–11) regular season record and finished third in the Big 12 Conference standings. The Red Raiders reached the 2015 Big 12 Conference baseball tournament championship game, where they were eliminated in the second round. Texas Tech did not receive an at-large bid to the 2015 NCAA Division I baseball tournament.

Personnel

Roster

Coaching staff

Schedule and results

! style="background:#CC0000;color:white;"| Regular Season
|- valign="top" 

|- align="center" bgcolor="bbffbb"
| February 19 || 2:00 pm || FSSW+ || * || #39 || Dan Law Field at Rip Griffin Park • Lubbock, TX || W12–3 || Moseley(1–0) || Schulfer(0–1) || – || 4,070 || 1–0 || –
|- align="center" bgcolor="ffbbbb"
| February 20 || 12:00 pm || || Milwaukee* || #39 || Dan Law Field at Rip Griffin Park • Lubbock, TX || L3–10 || Tuttle(1–0) || Gingery(0–1) || Sommers(1) || 4,176 || 1–1 || –
|- align="center" bgcolor="bbffbb"
| February 20 || 4:00 pm || || Milwaukee* || #39 || Dan Law Field at Rip Griffin Park • Lubbock, TX || W9–1 || Damron(1–0) || Reuss(0–1) || Martin(1) || 4,176 || 2–1 || –
|- align="center" bgcolor="bbffbb"
| February 21 || 12:00 pm || || Milwaukee* || #39 || Dan Law Field at Rip Griffin Park • Lubbock, TX || W12–0 || Lanning(1–0) || Keller(0–1) || – || 3,097 || 3–1 || –
|- align="center" bgcolor="bbffbb"
| February 24 || 6:30 pm ||  || at * ||  || Don Sanders Stadium • Huntsville, TX || W11–6 || Martin(1–0) || Mills(0–1) || – || 1,108 || 4–1 || –
|- align="center" bgcolor="bbffbb"
| February 26 || 12:00 pm || MLBNRSSW || #16 * ||  || Minute Maid Park • Houston, TX (Shiners Hospitals for Children College Classic) || W3–2 || Howard(1–0) || Lantrip(0–1) || Martin(2) || 5,628 || 5–1 || –
|- align="center" bgcolor="bbffbb"
| February 27 || 12:00 pm || MLBNRSSW || #6 Louisiana–Lafayette* ||  || Minute Maid Park • Houston, TX (Shiners Hospitals for Children College Classic)  || W5–310 || Shetter(1–0) || Moore(1–1) || – || 7,881 || 6–1 || –
|- align="center" bgcolor="ffbbbb"
| February 28 || 11:00 am || MLBRSSW || #24 Arkansas* ||  || Minute Maid Park • Houston, TX (Shiners Hospitals for Children College Classic) || L6–10 || Chadwick(1–0) || Howard(1–1) || – || 6,516 || 6–2 || –
|-

|- align="center" bgcolor="ffbbbb"
| March 1 || 6:30 pm || || * ||  || Dan Law Field at Rip Griffin Park • Lubbock, TX || L6–7 || Butts(1–0) || Lanning(1–1) || Butcher(1) || 3,453 || 6–3 || –
|- align="center" bgcolor="bbffbb"
| March 2 || 2:00 pm || || New Mexico State* ||  || Dan Law Field at Rip Griffin Park • Lubbock, TX || W14–2 || Gingery(1–1) || Reyes(0–1) || – || 2,922 || 7–3 || –
|- align="center" bgcolor="ffbbbb"
| March 4 || 6:30 pm || FSSW+ || #29 * ||  || Dan Law Field at Rip Griffin Park • Lubbock, TX || L3–7 || Quinn(2–1) || Moseley(1–1) || – || 4,191 || 7–4 || –
|- align="center" bgcolor="bbffbb"
| March 5 || 2:00 pm || || #29 Cal State Fullerton* ||  || Dan Law Field at Rip Griffin Park • Lubbock, TX || W6–5 || Howard(2–1) || Seabold(0–1) || Dugger(1) || 3,557 || 8–4 || –
|- align="center" bgcolor="ffbbbb"
| March 6 || 12:30 pm || FSSW+ || #29 Cal State Fullerton* ||  || Dan Law Field at Rip Griffin Park • Lubbock, TX || L1–4 || Eastman(3–0) || Damron(1–1) || Hockin(2) || 3,505 || 8–5 || –
|- align="center" bgcolor="ffbbbb"
| March 11 || 9:00 pm || || at #18 * ||  || Evans Diamond • Berkeley, CA || L2–9 || Jefferies(4–0) || Lanning(1–2) || – || 509 || 8–6 || –
|- align="center" bgcolor="bbffbb"
| March 12 || 4:00 pm || || at #18 California* ||  || Evans Diamond • Berkeley, CA || W11–8 || Howard(3–1) || Dodson(0–2) || – || 575 || 9–6 || –
|- align="center" bgcolor="bbffbb"
| March 15 || 7:00 pm || || * ||  || Globe Life Park • Arlington, TX || W6–4 || Moseley(2–1) || Michalski(0–1) || Dugger(2) || 4,033 || 10–6 || –
|- align="center" bgcolor="bbffbb"
| March 18 || 4:05 pm || FSSW || at Baylor ||  || Baylor Ballpark • Waco, TX || W5–0 || Martin(2–0) || Castano(2–2) || – || 2,328 || 11–6 || 1–0
|- align="center" bgcolor="ffbbbb"
| March 19 || 3:00 pm || FCSC || at Baylor ||  || Baylor Ballpark • Waco, TX || L3–4 || Ott2–2 || Moseley(2–2) || Montemayor(4) || 3,523 || 11–7 || 1–1
|- align="center" bgcolor="bbffbb"
| March 20 || 1:00 pm || FSSW+ || at Baylor ||  || Baylor Ballpark • Waco, TX || W6–5 || Howard(4–1) || Lewis(0–3) || Dugger(3) || 2,377 || 12–7 || 2–1
|- align="center" bgcolor="bbffbb"
| March 22 || 2:00 pm || || * ||  || Dan Law Field at Rip Griffin Park • Lubbock, TX || W14–10 || Shetter(2–0) || Tripp(0–1) || – || 2,757 || 13–7 || –
|- align="center" bgcolor="bbffbb"
| March 24 || 6:30 pm || FSSW+ || Oklahoma ||  || Dan Law Field at Rip Griffin Park • Lubbock, TX|| W5–0 || Martin(3–0) || A. Hansen(0–4) || Howard(1) || 3,231 || 14–7 || 3–1
|- align="center" bgcolor="bbffbb"
| March 25 || 6:30 pm || || Oklahoma ||  || Dan Law Field at Rip Griffin Park • Lubbock, TX || W6–1 || Gingery(2–1) || Andritsos(3–2) || – || 4,014 || 15–7 || 4–1
|- align="center" bgcolor="bbffbb"
| March 26 || 2:00 pm || || Oklahoma ||  || Dan Law Field at Rip Griffin Park • Lubbock, TX || W13–7 || Howard(5–1) || Berry(0–2) || Moseley(1) || 4,432 || 16–7 || 5–1
|- align="center" bgcolor="ffbbbb"
| March 28 || 8:05 pm || || at * || #29 || Earl Wilson Stadium • Paradise, NV || L5–8 || Wilson(1–2) || Shetter(2–1) || Wright(5) || 336 || 16–8 || –
|- align="center" bgcolor="bbffbb"
| March 29 || 4:05 pm || || at UNLV* || #29 || Earl Wilson Stadium • Paradise, NV || W14–6 || Damron(2–1) || Myers(0–2) || – || 436 || 17–8 || –
|-

|- align="center" bgcolor="bbffbb"
| April 2 || 1:00 pm || || Kansas State || #29 || Dan Law Field at Rip Griffin Park • Lubbock, TX || W10–3 || Martin(4–0) || MaVorhis(3–2) || Shetter(1) || 4,145 || 18–8 || 6–1
|- align="center" bgcolor="bbffbb"
| April 2 || 4:15 pm || || Kansas State || #29 || Dan Law Field at Rip Griffin Park • Lubbock, TX || W10–4 || Gingery(3–1) || Rigler(2–5) || Howard(2) || 4,145 || 19–8 || 7–1
|- align="center" bgcolor="bbffbb"
| April 3 || 12:00 pm || || Kansas State || #29 || Dan Law Field at Rip Griffin Park • Lubbock, TX || W6–5 || Dugger(1–0) || Fischer(1–3) || Moseley(2) || 3,655 || 20–8 || 8–1
|- align="center" bgcolor="ffbbbb"
| April 5 || 5:00 pm || || at #5 Florida State* || #19 || Mike Martin Field at Dick Howser Stadium • Tallahassee, FL || L1–10 || Voyles(3–0) || Lanning(1–3) || – || 4,002 || 20–9 || –
|- align="center" bgcolor="bbffbb"
| April 6 || 5:00 pm || ESPN3 || at #5 Florida State* || #19 || Mike Martin Field at Dick Howser Stadium • Tallahassee, FL || W8–4 || Dugger(2–0) || Sands(3–3) || Howard(3) || 3,821 || 21–9 || –
|- align="center" bgcolor="bbffbb"
| April 8 || 6:00 pm || FSSW+FCSP || at Oklahoma State || #19 || Reynolds Stadium • Stillwater, OK || W5–1 || Moseley(3–2) || Hatch(2–1) || – || 1,977 || 22–9 || 9–1
|- align="center" bgcolor="bbffbb"
| April 9 || 3:00 pm || Cox OK || at Oklahoma State || #19 || Reynolds Stadium • Stillwater, OK || W8–2 || Dugger(3–0) || Cobb(3–5) || – || 2,855 || 23–9 || 10–1
|- align="center" bgcolor="bbffbb"
| April 10 || 1:00 pm || FCSP || at Oklahoma State || #19 || Reynolds Stadium • Stillwater, OK || W15–57 || Harpenau(1–0) || Elliott(3–2) || – || 1,258 || 24–9 || 11–1
|- align="center" bgcolor="bbffbb"
| April 13 || 2:00 pm || || Sam Houston State* || #10 || Dan Law Field at Rip Griffin Park • Lubbock, TX || W8–6 || Lanning(2–3) || Rahm(0–3) || Howard(4) || 3,176 || 25–9 || –
|- align="center" bgcolor="bbffbb"
| April 13 || 5:15 pm || || Sam Houston State* || #10 || Dan Law Field at Rip Griffin Park • Lubbock, TX || W20–3 || Damron(3–1) || Brown(0–4) || – || 3,176 || 26–9 || –
|- align="center" bgcolor="bbffbb"
| April 15 || 12:00 pm || || * || #10 || Dan Law Field at Rip Griffin Park • Lubbock, TX (Brooks Wallace Memorial Series) || W3–1 || Martin(5–0) || Pyatt(0–3) || Howard(5) || 2,891 || 27–9 || –
|- align="center" bgcolor="bbffbb"
| April 16 || 12:00 pm || || San Diego State* || #10 || Dan Law Field at Rip Griffin Park • Lubbock, TX (Brooks Wallace Memorial Series) || W10–0 || Shetter(3–1) || Reyes(0–4) || – || 4,050 || 28–9 || –
|- align="center" bgcolor="bbffbb"
| April 17 || 11:30 am || || San Diego State* || #10 || Dan Law Field at Rip Griffin Park • Lubbock, TX (Brooks Wallace Memorial Series) || W7–2 || Moseley(4–2) || Thompson(1–6) || – || 3,330 || 29–9 || –
|- align="center" bgcolor="bbffbb"
| April 19 || 7:00 pm || Comcast 26 || at New Mexico* || #7 || Santa Ana Star Field • Albuquerque, NM || W7–4 || Howard(6–1) || Sanchez(0–4) || – || 614 || 30–9 || –
|- align="center" bgcolor="ffbbbb"
| April 20 || 2:00 pm || Comcast 26 || at New Mexico* || #7 || Santa Ana Star Field • Albuquerque, NM || L5–610 || Estrella(2–1) || Brown(0–1) || – || 811 || 30–10 || –
|- align="center" bgcolor="bbffbb"
| April 22 || 6:30 pm || FSSW+ || Texas || #7 || Dan Law Field at Rip Griffin Park • Lubbock, TX || W13–6 || Martin(6–0) || Dunbar(0–1) || – || 4,432 || 31–10 || 12–1
|- align="center" bgcolor="ffbbbb"
| April 23 || 2:00 pm || FSSW+ || Texas || #7 || Dan Law Field at Rip Griffin Park • Lubbock, TX || L4–7 || Culbreth(8–2) || Moseley(4–3) || Kingham(2) || 4,432 || 31–11 || 12–2
|- align="center" bgcolor="ffbbbb"
| April 24 || 2:00 pm || FSSW+ || Texas || #7 || Dan Law Field at Rip Griffin Park • Lubbock, TX || L1–177 || Johnston(3–1) || Howard(6–2) || – || 4,432 || 31–12 || 12–3
|- align="center" bgcolor="cccccc"
| April 26 || 6:30 pm || || at * || #10 || Crutcher Scott Field • Abilene, TX || colspan=7 style="text-align:center"| Game cancelled due to weather. Later rescheduled for May 10 after Oral Roberts game got cancelled.
|- align="center" bgcolor="bbffbb"
| April 27 || 6:30 pm || || vs. Abilene Christian* || #10 || Security Bank Ballpark • Midland, TX || W5–4 || Howard(7–2) || Lambright(0–1) || – || 4,268 || 32–12 || –
|- align="center" bgcolor="bbffbb"
| April 29 || 8:00 pm || FS1 || at #11 TCU || #10 || Lupton Stadium • Fort Worth, TX || W7–3 || Martin(7–0) || Trieglaff(4–1) || – || 4,564 || 33–12 || 13–3
|- align="center" bgcolor="ffbbbb"
| April 30 || 4:00 pm || FSSW || at #11 TCU || #10 || Lupton Stadium • Fort Worth, TX || L6–13 || Guillory(1–1) || Moseley(4–4) || – || 6,451 || 33–13 || 13–4
|-

|- align="center" bgcolor="bbffbb"
| May 1 || 1:00 pm || || at #11 TCU || #10 || Lupton Stadium • Fort Worth, TX || W3–1 || Damron(4–1) || Hill(2–3) || Mushinski(1) || 5,829 || 34–13 || 14–4
|- align="center" bgcolor="bbffbb"
| May 6 || 6:00 pm || ESPN3 || at Kansas || #10 || Hoglund Ballpark • Lawrence, KS || W10–3 || Martin(8–0) || Krauth(4–5) || – || 1,108 || 35–13 || 15–4
|- align="center" bgcolor="bbffbb"
| May 7 || 2:00 pm || ESPN3 || at Kansas || #10 || Hoglund Ballpark • Lawrence, KS || W9–2 || Gingery(4–1) || Goddard(2–5) || – || 1,201 || 36–13 || 16–4
|- align="center" bgcolor="bbffbb"
| May 8 || 1:00 pm || ESPN3 || at Kansas || #10 || Hoglund Ballpark • Lawrence, KS || W6–3 || Moseley(5–4) || Weiman(2–6) || Howard(6) || 905 || 37–13 || 17–4
|- align="center" bgcolor="cccccc"
| May 10 || 1:00 pm || || vs. * || #9 || Dr Pepper Ballpark • Frisco, TX || colspan=7 style="text-align:center"| Game cancelled due to projected weather, replaced with at Abilene Christian
|- align="center" bgcolor="bbffbb"
| May 10 || 6:30 pm || || at Abilene Christian* || #9 || Crutcher Scott Field • Abilene, TX || W7–2 || Moseley(6–4) || Lambright(0–2) || – || 1,064 || 38–13 || –
|- align="center" bgcolor="bbffbb"
| May 19 || 6:30 pm || FSSW || West Virginia || #7 || Dan Law Field at Rip Griffin Park • Lubbock, TX || W2–1 || Howard(8–2) || Grove(2–4) || Moseley(3) || 3,966 || 39–13 || 18–4
|- align="center" bgcolor="bbffbb"
| May 20 || 2:00 pm || || West Virginia || #7 || Dan Law Field at Rip Griffin Park • Lubbock, TX || W4–2 || Dugger(4–0) || Donato(3–4) || Moseley(4) || 3,842 || 40–13 || 19–4
|- align="center" bgcolor="ffbbbb"
| May 21 || 2:00 pm || || West Virginia || #7 || Dan Law Field at Rip Griffin Park • Lubbock, TX || L7–8 || Smith(4–1) || Howard(8–3) || – || 4,432 || 40–14 || 19–5
|-

|- 
! style="background:#CC0000;color:white;"| Post-Season
|-

|- align="center" bgcolor="bbffbb"
| May 25 || 12:30 pm || FCSCFSSW+ || Kansas State || #7 || Chickasaw Bricktown Ballpark • Oklahoma City, OK || W8–5 || Dugger(5–0) || Erickson(2–1) || Howard(7) || 4,047 || 41–14 || 1–0
|- align="center" bgcolor="ffbbbb"
| May 26 || 4:00 pm || FCSCFSSW+ || West Virginia || #7 || Chickasaw Bricktown Ballpark • Oklahoma City, OK || L4–9 || Smith(5–1) || Shetter(3–2) || – || 4,064 || 41–15 || 1–1
|- align="center" bgcolor="ffbbbb"
| May 27 || 3:15 pm || FCSCFSSW+ || Oklahoma || #7 || Chickasaw Bricktown Ballpark • Oklahoma City, OK || L4–177 || Grove(2–1) || Gingery(4–2) || – || 5,104 || 41–16 || 1–2
|-

|- align="center" bgcolor="bbffbb"
| June 3 || 2:00 pm || ESPN3 || * || #7 || Dan Law Field at Rip Griffin Park • Lubbock, TX(NCAA Regional) || W12–1 || Martin(9–0) || Dube(6–4) || – || 4,732 || 42–16 || 1–0
|- align="center" bgcolor="bbffbb"
| June 4 || 6:00 pm || ESPN3 || New Mexico* || #7 || Dan Law Field at Rip Griffin Park • Lubbock, TX(NCAA Regional) || W4–3 || Shetter(4–2) || Tripp(2–2) || Howard(8) || 4,732 || 43–16 || 2–0
|- align="center" bgcolor="ffbbbb"
| June 5 || 6:15 pm || ESPN3 || #19 * || #7 || Dan Law Field at Rip Griffin Park • Lubbock, TX(NCAA Regional) || L6–10 || Johnson(5–3) || Damron(4–2) || Fritz(1) || 4,732 || 43–17 || 2–1
|- align="center" bgcolor="bbffbb"
| June 6 || 2:00 pm || ESPN3 || #19 Dallas Baptist* || #7 || Dan Law Field at Rip Griffin Park • Lubbock, TX(NCAA Regional) || W5–3 || Howard(9–3) || Wilson(0–1) || – || 4,732 || 44–17 || 3–1
|- align="center" bgcolor="ffbbbb"
| June 10 || 7:00 pm || ESPNU || #15 * || #7 || Dan Law Field at Rip Griffin Park • Lubbock, TX(NCAA Super Regional) || L6–8 || Kruczynski(8–1) || Martin(9–1) || Bridges(2) || 4,817 || 44–18 || 3–2
|- align="center" bgcolor="bbffbb"
| June 11 || 2:00 pm || ESPNU || #15 East Carolina* || #7 || Dan Law Field at Rip Griffin Park • Lubbock, TX(NCAA Super Regional) || W3–113 || Dugger(6–0) || Lanier(2–2) || – || 4,817 || 45–18 || 4–2
|- align="center" bgcolor="bbffbb"
| June 12 || 2:00 pm || ESPNU || #15 East Carolina* || #7 || Dan Law Field at Rip Griffin Park • Lubbock, TX(NCAA Super Regional) || W11–0 || Lanning(3–3) || Wolfe(6–4) || – || 4,817 || 46–18 || 5–2
|- align="center" bgcolor="ffbbbb"
| June 19 || 2:00 pm || ESPNU || vs. #3 TCU* || #4 || TD Ameritrade Park • Omaha, NE(College World Series) || L3–5 || Burnett(3–1) || Dugger(6–1) || Feltman(9) || 19,834 || 46–19 || 5–3
|- align="center" bgcolor="bbffbb"
| June 21 || 2:00 pm || ESPN2 || vs. #1 Florida* || #4 || TD Ameritrade Park • Omaha,NE(College World Series) || W3–2 || Martin(10–1) || Faedo(13–3) || Howard(9) || 16,865 || 47–19 || 6–3
|- align="center" bgcolor=""
| June 23 || 7:00 pm || ESPN2 || vs. #5 Coastal Carolina* || #4 || TD Ameritrade Park • Omaha,NE(College World Series) ||  ||  ||  ||  ||  ||  ||
|-

|-
| style="font-size:88%" | Legend:       = Win       = Loss      Bold = Texas Tech team member
|-
| style="font-size:88%" | All rankings from Collegiate Baseball.
|-

Rankings

References

Texas Tech Red Raiders
Texas Tech Red Raiders baseball seasons
Texas Tech
College World Series seasons